Matthew Davis Cowden is the VIII bishop of the Episcopal Diocese of West Virginia. He was elected from a slate of three candidates by the 144th diocesan convention on September 25, 2021, and consecrated in Wesley Chapel on the campus of West Virginia Wesleyan University on March 12, 2022.  Upon Bishop W. Michie Klusmeyer's retirement on October 13, 2022, he became the Eighth Bishop of West Virginia.

From 2009 until his election he was rector of St. Michael and All Angels Episcopal Church in South Bend, Indiana. He received the Master of Divinity from Virginia Theological Seminary in 2006. He previously received a bachelor's degree from Florida State University and a master's degree from the University of California Los Angeles and worked as a college theatre professor. He and his wife Melissa have three children.

See also
 List of Episcopal bishops of the United States
 Historical list of the Episcopal bishops of the United States

References

Living people
Year of birth missing (living people)
Florida State University alumni
University of California, Los Angeles alumni
Virginia Theological Seminary alumni
Episcopal bishops of West Virginia